Suppawat Srinothai (born May 9, 1988), simply known as Ten, is a Thai professional footballer who plays as a goalkeeper for Thai League 2 club Trat  .

Club career

External links
 Profile at Goal

1988 births
Living people
Suppawat Srinothai
Association football goalkeepers
Suppawat Srinothai
Suppawat Srinothai
Suppawat Srinothai
Suppawat Srinothai
Suppawat Srinothai
Suppawat Srinothai
Suppawat Srinothai